In den Gärten Pharaos ("In the Gardens of the Pharaoh") is the second album by German band Popol Vuh, released in 1971 by record label Pilz.

Content 

On In den Gärten Pharaos, Florian Fricke made more extensive use of the Moog synthesizer and experimental electronic sounds.

On side A is the title track "In den Gärten Pharaos", an ancient, contemplative meditation with the sound of rippling water, Moog synthesizer, Fender Rhodes, and African percussion. The Moog creates an exotic and alien sound while the African percussion and the water effects are interwoven throughout bringing the listener back to earth. The track was recorded at Trixi Studio in Munich.

The second song "Vuh" is dominated by one massive organ chord creating an epic wall of sound. "Vuh" uses the wide range of the organ, both the low drones and the high crescendos. Turkish percussion and layers of cymbals increase the intensity of the music. The song was then played and recorded on a medieval cathedral organ in the Stiftskirche St. Margareta, Baumburg (Altenmarkt) in Southern Germany. The organ was completely renewed in 1997.

Reception 

Perfect Sound Forever described it as "an altogether more mature and unified work" than Affenstunde. Head Heritage described it as "the most mind-blowing mystical experience" and "awe-inspiring".

Legacy 

The album was ranked the 5th greatest of the 1970s by FACT magazine.

Track listing

Personnel 

Florian Fricke – Moog synthesizer, Fender Rhodes, medieval cathedral organ 
Holger Trülzsch – African and Turkish percussion
Frank Fiedler – Moog-Synthesizer-mixdown

 Additional personnel

 Helmut Fritz – album cover
 Steffen Metzner – sleeve photography

References

External links 

 Popol Vuh discography
 In den Gärten Pharaos at Venco.com.pl

Popol Vuh (band) albums
1971 albums
Pilz (record label) albums